Kalavari Samsaram is a 1982 Telugu-language drama film, produced by Donepudi Brahmaiah under the Maheswari Combines banner and directed by K. S. Rami Reddy. It stars Krishna and Sridevi, with music composed by K. V. Mahadevan. The film is based on Maadireddy Sulachana's Agni Pariksha (Novel).

Plot
The film revolves around a wealthy conjoined family, Kodandaramaiah (Satyanarayana) is its paterfamilias who has two brothers Chalapathi (Allu Ramalingaiah) & Late Raghupathi. The entire family is surrounded by their respective wives, children and love & affection between them. Suddenly, a tragedical  incident,  Kodandaramaiah passes away. Before dying he reveals regarding their present financial status to his elder son Vishnu (Krishna) which is completely immersed in debts. By means of his kindness & spendthrift family expenditure. Here, Vishnu promises his father to clear the debts silently without defaming his image. There onwards, he struggles hard, raises dictatorship over the family and inturn he receives their resent. However, being an adamant he safeguards the family prestige & honor.

Cast

Krishna as Vishnu 
Sridevi as Sujatha 
Satyanarayana as Kodandaramaiah
Allu Ramalingaiah as Chalapathi 
Giri Babu as Raghu 
Sudhakar as Uday
Rajendra Prasad as Rajeev 
Sakshi Ranga Rao as Subbaramaiah
Potti Prasad as Gumastha
Haranath as Vasanthi's brother
Telephone Satyanarayana as Doctor
Madan Mohan as Raghavaiah
Geetha as Vasanthi
Pandari Bai as Kanthamma
Suryakantam as Vasanthi's mother
Rohini as Sudha
Jayamalini as item number
Shubha as Sarala
Jhansi as Susheelamma
Athili Lakshmi as Kamalamma
P. R. Varalakshmi as Sumathi
Kakinada Shyamala as Sujatha's sister
Nirmalamma as Sujatha's mother

Soundtrack

Music composed by K. V. Mahadevan. Music released on HMV Audio Company.

References

External links
 

Indian drama films
Films based on Indian novels
Films scored by K. V. Mahadevan
1982 drama films
1982 films